The 2018 College Nationals was the 23rd Men's College Nationals.  The College Nationals was a team handball tournament to determine the College National Champion from 2018 from the US. The University of Virginia played extremely well, wildly outperforming expectations behind strong performances from the outgoing fourth-year class, but ultimately fell short in the final to the machine-like cadets from West Point. UVA has improved vastly over the last three years, and has risen to the elite ranks of collegiate team handball.

Venues
The championship was played at two venues at the United States Military Academy in West Point, New York.

Draw

The seeding was based on the USA Men's Top 5 College Rankings from April. This season was the first season such a ranking exist.

The 5th ranked team Illinois State University was not able to play at the college nationals. Because of missing money to travel.

Seeding

(т=Tie; NR=Not ranked; NV=No votes)

Modus
The nine teams were split in 3 groups A-C. And they play a round robin.

The winner of each group forms a new group D the runner-up's group D and the third group F.

The winner of group D played against the winner of group E the semifinal one and the second of group D played against the third of group D the semifinal two.

The losers of the semis play a small final.

The winners of the semis play the final.

The second and third of group F played an 8/9 classification. The loser becomes ninth. And the winner played against the loser of the 6/7 classification the 7th place game.

The winner of the 6/7 classification (third of group E against first of group F) played against the second of group E the 5th place game.

The games of the group and seeding stages had a game duration of 2×20 minutes and 5 break.
The placement and semi-final games had a game duration of 2×25 minutes and 10 break.
The small final and the final had a game duration of 2×30 minutes and 10 break.

Results
Source:

Group stage

Group A

Group B

Group C

Seeding stage

Group D

Group E

Group F

Championship

Semifinals

Small Final

Final

Placement Games

8/9 Classification

6/7 Classification

7th Place

5th Place

Final ranking

Awards
Source:

Top scorers
Source:

All-Tournament Team
Source:

1st team

2nd team

References

External links
 Competition Page

USA Team Handball College Nationals by year
Army Black Knights team handball